Arisaema dracontium, the dragon-root or green dragon, is a herbaceous perennial plant in the genus Arisaema and the family Araceae. It is native to North America from Quebec through Minnesota south through Florida and Texas, where it is found growing in damp woods. Normally, a plant produces one leaf with a long petiole, its leaf is composed of 7 to 13 leaflets, with its central leaflet being the largest one and with leaflets becoming smaller as they are produced distally, the leaflets are held out horizontally over the plant. The tail-like spadix grows out around the top of its spathe. After flowering, up to 150 berries are produced in a club-shaped column. In late summer, the green berries turn orange-red, each berry produces 1 to 3 seeds. It is listed as a vulnerable species in Canada.

Harriet Martineau, in recounting her travels in America in the 1830s, reported observing a young woman "rubbing her teeth with dragon-root."

Classification
Within the genus Arisaema, A. dracontium is classified in the section Tortuosa and is most closely related to the Mexican A. macrophyllum.  In fact, A. macrophyllum has sometimes been considered a subspecies of A. dracontium. The rest of the section contains species from east Asia and India. A. dracontium is not a close relative to the other American Arisaema species, A. triphyllum (jack-in-the-pulpit), which is in a different section of Arisaema.
Like A. triphyllum, the tuberous taproot can cause a burning sensation if eaten raw.

References

External links
 

dracontium
Flora of the Eastern United States
Flora of Canada
Flora of Mexico
Plants described in 1753
Taxa named by Heinrich Wilhelm Schott